Kevaughn Frater (born 14 December 1994) is a Jamaican footballer who plays as a forward for USL Championship club New Mexico United.

Club career
Frater was part of the Harbour View squad since he was sixteen years old, before signing on loan with United Soccer League side Real Monarchs SLC in January 2016.

On January 26, 2017, the Colorado Springs Switchbacks FC announced Frater would be joining the team for a season long loan. Frater won USL's Player of the Week after a 2 Goal performance against LA Galaxy II on 10 June 2017.

In December 2018, Frater signed with New Mexico United. Following a 4 goal April 2019, including a hat-trick against Portland Timbers 2, Frater was voted the USL Championship’s Player of the Month.

Bengaluru FC
On February 12, 2020, Frater joined Indian Super League side Bengaluru FC, an outfit from the Garden city Bengaluru.

Israel
On July 6, 2020, he had signed for the Israeli Premier League club Maccabi Netanya.

On June 23, 2021, Frater signed for Hapoel Nof HaGalil.

United States
Frater returned to New Mexico United on August 8, 2022.

International career
In November 2019, Frater earned his second call-up to the Jamaica senior national team. He made his debut on 15 November 2019 in a CONCACAF Nations League game against Antigua & Barbuda.

Career statistics

Club

International

References

External links
 
 

1994 births
Living people
Jamaican footballers
Jamaica international footballers
Harbour View F.C. players
Real Monarchs players
Phoenix Rising FC players
New Mexico United players
Bengaluru FC players
Maccabi Netanya F.C. players
Hapoel Nof HaGalil F.C. players
Hapoel Ra'anana A.F.C. players
National Premier League players
USL Championship players
Israeli Premier League players
Jamaican expatriate footballers
Expatriate soccer players in the United States
Expatriate footballers in Israel
Expatriate footballers in India
Jamaican expatriate sportspeople in the United States
Jamaican expatriate sportspeople in Israel
Jamaican expatriate sportspeople in India
Association football midfielders
People from Saint Andrew Parish, Jamaica